Moustapha Djallit (born September 21, 1983, in Béchar) is an Algerian former footballer.

Club career
He previously played for IR Mecheria before joining WA Tlemcen.

On January 4, 2012, Djallit joined MC Alger on a free transfer from JSM Béjaïa. On March 6, Djallit scored his first goals for MC Alger, netting a brace against ASO Chlef. However, MC Alger lost the game 4–2. He repeated the performance the following game with another two goals against MC Saïda, with MC Alger winning 2-0 this time. He finished his first season with MC Alger with 9 goals in 14 games.

Djallit started the 2012–13 season with a first half hat-trick against WA Tlemcen as MC Alger went on to win 3–0. He followed up that performance with an injury time winner against JS Saoura in the next game.

International career
On March 3, 2010, Djallit made his debut for the Algeria A' National Team in a 4-0 friendly win against Liechtenstein.

Honours
 Won the Algerian Second Division once with WA Tlemcen in 2009
 Won the North African Super Cup once with ES Sétif in 2010
 Won the North African Cup Winners Cup once with ES Sétif in 2010

References

External links
 
 
 

1983 births
Living people
People from Béchar
Algerian footballers
Association football forwards
WA Tlemcen players
ES Sétif players
JSM Béjaïa players
MC Alger players
JS Saoura players
Algerian Ligue Professionnelle 1 players
2011 African Nations Championship players
Algeria A' international footballers
Algeria international footballers
Algerian football managers
JS Saoura managers
21st-century Algerian people